Radek Štěpánek and Michal Tabara were the defending champions but only Štěpánek competed that year with Leoš Friedl.

Friedl and Štěpánek lost in the first round to Martin Damm and Cyril Suk.

Karsten Braasch and Andrei Olhovskiy won in the final 6–3, 6–3 against Simon Aspelin and Andrew Kratzmann.

Seeds

  Mahesh Bhupathi /  Max Mirnyi (semifinals)
  David Rikl /  Sjeng Schalken (semifinals)
  Martin Damm /  Cyril Suk (quarterfinals)
  Tomáš Cibulec /  Pavel Vízner (first round)

Draw

External links
 2002 Estoril Open Men's Doubles draw

2002 Men's Doubles
Doubles
Estoril Open